Bhagyashree Dasani known mononymously as Bhagyashree (née Patwardhan; born 23 February 1969) is an Indian actress. She is known for her roles in Hindi language film and television. She is a receipent of Filmfare Award, in addition to receiving nomination for Indian Television Academy Award.

In addition to acting in films, she has been engaged in various philanthropic activities. Her recent television work includes featuring as a talent judge for dance reality show DID Super Moms. Since 1990, she has been married to Himalaya Dassani, with whom she has one son Abhimanyu Dassani and one daughter Avantaika Dassani.

Early life 
Bhagyashree is from the Marathi royal family of Sangli in Maharashtra. Her father, Vijay Singhrao Madhavrao Patwardhan, is the titular Raja of Sangli. She is the eldest of three daughters, the other two being Madhuvanti and Purnima.

Career 
She started her acting career with the 1987 television serial Kachchi Dhoop, which was based on Louisa May Alcott's Little Women. She was approached to act in the serial by Amol Palekar, a renowned actor-director who offered her the role as the original actress had abandoned the project abruptly.

She made her film debut in the 1989 commercially successful Hindi film Maine Pyar Kiya, starring alongside Salman Khan where she played Suman. This remains her most successful and best known film to date, for which she won the Filmfare Award for Best Female Debut. After marriage to Himalaya Dassani in 1990, she acted in three films: Peepat's Qaid Main Hai Bulbul, K.C. Bokadia's Tyagi and Mahendra Shah's Paayal, all opposite her husband in 1992. She also acted with Avinash Wadhawan in Ghar Aaya Mera Pardesi in 1993. This was her last Hindi film in the 1990s and she went on to appear in a few Tamil, Kannada and Telugu films. She made her Telugu debut in the film Yuvaratna Rana (1998). She also appeared in episodes of the television series CID and Kabhie Kabhie. 

She returned to Hindi films in the mid 2000s appearing in Maa Santoshi Maa (2003), Humko Deewana Kar Gaye (2006) and Red Alert: The War Within (2010). After a gap of several years, she made her comeback to television with the TV serial Laut Aao Trisha aired on Life OK from 2014 to 2015. In 2019, she appeared in the Kannada film Seetharama Kalyana. She is set to return to Telugu films with the Telugu remake of the 2014 Hindi film 2 States.

In 2021, she will be making a comeback to Hindi films with the upcoming releases Thalaivi and Radhe Shyam.She will be seen playing Prabhas' mother in Radhe Shyam. 

In February 2022, she entered as a contestant in StarPlus's Smart Jodi with her husband, Himalaya Dasani.

Other ventures 
In March 2015, Bhagyashree became brand ambassador of the Bhagyashree Scheme, launched by the Government of Maharashtra. Bhagyashree Scheme caters to girl child from below poverty line families.

Personal life 

Bhagyashree married Himalaya Dasani in 1990. They have two children, a son and a daughter. Her son, Abhimanyu Dasani, won the Filmfare Award for Best Male Debut for his performance in the 2019 film Mard Ko Dard Nahi Hota. Her daughter, Avantika Dassani, debuted with the web-series Mithya.

Filmography

Film

Television

References 

Indian film actresses
Indian television actresses
Actresses in Hindi cinema
Living people
Actresses from Mumbai
Marathi people
Actresses in Bhojpuri cinema
Actresses in Kannada cinema
Actresses in Marathi cinema
Actresses in Telugu cinema
People from Sangli district
Filmfare Awards winners
Child actresses in Hindi cinema
Actresses in Hindi television
1969 births